Doug or Douglas Lewis may refer to:

 Doug Lewis (politician) (born 1938), former Canadian politician
 Doug Lewis (ice hockey) (1921–1994), Canadian ice hockey player
 Doug Lewis (skier) (born 1964), American alpine ski racer
 R. Doug Lewis, Executive Director of the Election Center
 Douglas Lewis (boxer) (1898–1981), Canadian boxer